Pheia attenuata is a moth in the subfamily Arctiinae. It was described by William James Kaye in 1919. It is found in Panama.

References

Moths described in 1919
attenuata